The United States House Committee on Elections is a former standing committee of the United States House of Representatives.

Article 1, section 5, of the Constitution of the United States specifies: "Each House shall be the Judge of the Elections, Returns, and Qualifications of its own Members." The Committee on Elections was established as the first standing committee of the House to perform this function on April 13, 1789, just two weeks after the first quorum allowed the House of Representatives to organize itself. Rule number 7 of the first rules adopted by the House of Representatives specifies the character and jurisdiction of the committee:

7. A standing Committee on Elections shall be appointed, to consist of seven members, it shall be the duty of the said committee to examine and report upon the certificates of election, or other credentials of the members returned to serve in this House, and to take into their consideration all such matters as shall or may come in question, and be referred to them by the House, touching returns and elections, and to report their proceedings, with their opinion thereupon, to the House.

From 1789 until the mid-19th century the number of contested election cases remained stable at an average of three per Congress. After the 34th Congress (1855–57) the number of contested seats rose sporadically to a peak of 38 during the 54th Congress (1895–97). In 1895, due to the increase in workload, the committee was split into three separate committees: Elections #1, Elections #2, and Elections #3. After 1935 the number of contested elections returned to an average of three per Congress, and in 1947 the three Elections Committees were abolished and their jurisdiction included in that of the new House Administration Committee.

In November 2018, Nancy Pelosi announced her intention to restore the Elections Subcommittee of the Committee on House Administration in the 116th Congress and name Congresswoman Marcia L. Fudge the Chair.

Historical committee rosters

1st Congress

1st session

2nd session

3rd session

2nd Congress

1st session

2nd session

3rd Congress

1st session

2nd session

4th Congress

1st session

2nd session

5th Congress

1st session

2nd session

3rd session

6th Congress

1st session

2nd session

7th Congress

1st session

2nd session

8th Congress

1st session

2nd session

9th Congress

1st session

2nd session

10th Congress

1st and 2nd sessions

11th Congress

1st and 2nd sessions

3rd session

12th Congress

1st session

2nd session

13th Congress

1st session

2nd session

3rd session

14th Congress

1st session

2nd session

15th Congress

1st session

2nd session

16th Congress

1st session

2nd session

17th Congress

1st session

2nd session

18th Congress

1st session

2nd session

19th Congress

1st session

2nd session

20th Congress

1st session

2nd session

21st Congress

1st and 2nd sessions

22nd Congress

1st and 2nd sessions

23rd Congress

1st session

2nd session

External links
Committee on Elections at NARA

References

Elections
1789 establishments in the United States